Jindřich Plachta, born Jindřich Šolle (1 July 1899 – 6 November 1951) was a Czechoslovak film actor. He appeared in more than 100 films between 1926 and 1951.

Selected filmography

 The Lovers of an Old Criminal (1927)
 Father Vojtech (1929)
 Affair at the Grand Hotel (1929)
 Street Acquaintances (1929)
 Imperial and Royal Field Marshal (1930)
 Business Under Distress (1931)
 Muži v offsidu (1931)
 Anton Spelec, Sharp-Shooter (1932)
 Jedenácté přikázání (1935)
 Jánošík (1935)
 Camel Through the Eye of a Needle (1936)
 Three Men in the Snow (1936)
 Filosofská historie (1937)
 Cesta do hlubin študákovy duše (1939)
 Barbora Hlavsová (1942)
 Gabriela (1942)
 The Respectable Ladies of Pardubice (1944)
 Spring Song (1944)
 The Wedding Ring (1944)
 Průlom (1946)

References

External links
  Jindřich Plachta in Czech National Theater Archive
 FDb.cz – Jindřich Plachta (in Czech)
 ČSFD.cz – Jindřich Plachta (in Czech)
 

1899 births
1951 deaths
Czech male film actors
Czech male silent film actors
20th-century Czech male actors
Film people from Plzeň
Actors from Plzeň
Czech male stage actors